My God, My God, Why Hast Thou Forsaken Me?, originally titled as , is a 2005 Japanese drama film directed by Shinji Aoyama, starring Tadanobu Asano. It was screened in the Un Certain Regard section at the 2005 Cannes Film Festival.

Plot

A global virus is killing mankind, but 2 radical musicians seem curiously immune...

Cast
 Tadanobu Asano as Mizui
 Aoi Miyazaki as Hana
 Mariko Okada as Navi
 Masaya Nakahara as Asuhara
 Yasutaka Tsutsui as Miyagi
 Masahiro Toda as Natsuishi
 Shingo Tsurumi as Kazemoto
 Yusuke Kawazu as Miyazawa
 Erika Oda as Eriko

References

External links

2005 films
2000s science fiction drama films
2000s Japanese-language films
Japanese science fiction drama films
Films about music and musicians
Films directed by Shinji Aoyama
2000s Japanese films